Zirkow is a municipality on the German Baltic Sea island of Rügen in the county of Vorpommern-Rügen in the state of Mecklenburg-Western Pomerania.

Geography 
Zirkow lies in the Southeast Rügen Biosphere Reserve between the small town of Putbus and the Baltic Sea resort of Binz. In the northeast it borders on the lake of Schmachter See near Binz.

Municipal divisions 
Within the municipality of Zirkow are the following villages: Alt Süllitz, Dalkvitz, Nistelitz, Pantow, Schmacht, Serams and Viervitz.

History 
The village of Zirkow was first documented in 1495. The place name comes from the Slavic Sirakov and means "place of Sirak".

To 1326 the area was part of the Principality of Rügen and, thereafter, the Duchy of Pomerania.

Under the Treaty of Westphalia in 1648 Rügen, and thus Zirkow, came under Swedish rule, having previously belonged to the Duchy of Pomerania. In 1815 the parish, along with West Pomerania, went into the Prussian Province of Pomerania.

In 1818, Zirkow became part of the county of Landkreis Rügen, apart from a short spell from 1952 to 1955 when it was in the County of Putbus. It remained until 1990 in Kreis Rügen in the district of Rostock and became, in the same year, part of the state of Mecklenburg-Western Pomerania. From 1990, the county was renamed Landkreis Rügen until 2011 when it became part of the new county of Vorpommern-Rügen.

Sights 
 Brick church with a fieldstone base from the 1st half of the 15th century, see St. John's Church, Zirkow
 Historic village centre with protected thatched timber-framed houses
 Museum farm with the Rügenhaus
 Schmachter See and Fangerien Nature Reserve
 Hill of Rügener Jungfrau ("Rügen Virgin"), the so-called Busenberge ("bosom hills")

References

External links

Official website of Zirkow

Towns and villages on Rügen